The 1560s decade ran from January 1, 1560, to December 31, 1569.

References